RK Eurofarm Pelister (HC Eurofarm Pelister) is a handball club from Bitola, North Macedonia. They currently compete in the Macedonian Handball Super League and EHF European League.

History
The original team was the first handball club in Macedonia, formed in 1946 under the name Pelagonija. It later changed its name to Pelister in 1955. The 60s were very successful, winning 4 championships starting in 1960 till the last one in 1969. The club ended up winning three more titles in the 70s. In the 80s, the 1981 season was the last winning season, capturing their 8th Macedonian league title. From the 1983-84 season, Pelister began to participate regularly in the Yugoslav Handball Championship. They finished in third place in 1985 and were runners-up in back-to-back seasons (1986–87 and 1987–88) behind the dominant club Metaloplastika Šabac. Around that time the slogan "He who hasn't played in Bitola doesn't know what real support looks like" gained popularity, being uttered by the likes of Vlado Šola, Lino Červar and Zlatan Saračević. Pelister became the first Macedonian club to play in Europe. In 1986 they defeated AS Filippos Veriasand in the 1st round, but they ended up losing in 1/8 finals from Atlético Madrid BM winning 24:19 at home and 10:19 away (34:38) aggregate. In the 1988/1989 season they reached the EHF Cup quarterfinal, eliminating SPE Strovolos Nicosia, HC Banik and finally losing out to German club ASK Vorwärts. The first leg in Bitola was won by six goals, but the second leg in Berlin resulted in a loss by seven points 22:16 and 13:22 (35:38). When the Macedonian Handball Super League was formed in 1992, Pelister became the most successful club in the country, winning five league titles and five Cups that decade. In 1996, they made it to the semi-finals of the EHF Cup Winners' Cup where they lost on aggregate by one goal to the eventual champion TBV Lemgo. A record, 7,000 fans were in attendance for the rematch in Bitola. Another proof of Pelisters' dominance at the time, seven players on Macedonia's squad at the 1999 World Men's Handball Championship in Egypt played for the club.

The club's most successful European run was made during the 2001/02 season when they played in the EHF Challenge Cup. First, they started by beating Zilant Kazan in the 3rd round and advanced to round 4, where they went on to defeat Paris St. Germain on away goals. In the quarterfinal they got past Kilkis GAC 52-51, setting up a semifinal match-up with Frederiksberg IF. Pelister would go on to win that tie in dramatic fashion in Bitola, when Naumče Mojsovski scored a goal in the final seconds of the game to even the score on aggregate, going through on a penalty shootout by the final score of 61-60. In the final, Pelister lost to Skjern Håndbold, but even in that match-up they still ended up winning the home game by 7 goals. Proving yet again that it was no easy task for any road team to win in Bitola.

In 2005, Trifun Kostovski's Kometal became sponsor of the club bringing back the glory days, winning another double crown and capturing its sixth domestic league title, which was a record at the time. However, the success was short lived as Kometal left the following season. Since then, Pelister had been marred by financial problems and struggled to achieve the same level of success. 

On 29 November 2019, a joint ownership was signed by the owners of RK Eurofarm Rabotnik (which as formed in 2011 and owned by Eurofarm) and RK Pelister (owned by Bitola Municipality). According to the platform, RK Eurofarm Rabotnik would change the name to RK Eurofarm Pelister, and the original RK Pelister would change its name to RK Eurofarm Pelister 2. Eurofarm Pelister will be the leading club with high European ambitions, while Eurofarm Pelister 2 will be a developmental club filled with young handball players from Bitola and all of Macedonia.  The combination of a strong sponsor and a sports brand known throughout the former Yugoslavia took final shape through an agreement with the city administration in 2020. Eurofarm Pelister has already surpassed the domestic framework, played in the EHF Champions League and set the contours of a team that could return trophies back to "Boro Čurlevski" arena.

Accomplishments

Champions 
Winners (14)
 1st: 1961, 1966, 1968, 1969, 1970, 1971, 1979, 1981, 1993, 1994, 1996, 1998, 2000, 2005

Macedonian Handball Cup (6) 
 1st: 1990, 1994, 1996, 1998, 1999 and 2005

Macedonian Super Cup (2) 
 1st: 2021 and 2022

International 

Doboj International Handball Tournament (2)
 1st: 1996 and 1997

Regional 
SEHA League

  3rd: 2021–22

European record

EHF Cup Winners' Cup
 3rd: 1995-96

EHF Challenge Cup
 2nd: 2001–02

EHF European League
Quarter-finalist (1): 1988-89
2018–19 EHF Cup – Group stage

 EHF Champions League 
2019–20 – Group stage

Individual Club Awards 

 Double
 Winners (3): 1995–96, 1997–98, 2004–05

Arena
Eurofarm Pelister play all their home matches in the EHF Champions League, the regional SEHA League and in the domestic competitions in Sports Hall Boro Čurlevski. The arena has a current seating capacity of 3,500 and has undergone numerous renovations to meet EHF standards. 

In July 2018, the name of the arena was changed from "Mladost" to "Boro Churlevski", in honor of the late Boro Churlevski, a former handball player from Bitola.

Team

Current squad
Squad for the 2022–23 season

Goalkeepers
1  Urban Lesjak
 12  Boban Ristevski
 98  Marko Kizikj
Left Wingers
3  Goce Ojleski
8  Cvetan Kuzmanoski
 33  Petar Atanasijevikj
Right Wingers
 13  Mirko Radović (c)
 19  Nenad Kosteski
Line players
 37  Denis Vasiliev
 44  Žarko Peševski

Left Backs
 11  Kasper Kisum
 24  Milorad Kukoski
 34  Emilijan Gjorgovski 
 39  Mohamed Soussi
 51  Rudy Seri 
 77  Sebastian Henneberg
 91  Darko Stevanović
Central Backs
 14  Mario Tankoski
 23  Wilson Davyes
 88  Pavle Atanasijevikj
Right Backs
 17  Oussama Hosni
 30  Martin Velkovski

Transfers
Transfers for the season 2023–24

Joining

Leaving
  Sebastian Henneberg (LB) (to  Fredericia HK)

Staff

Professional staff

Management

Former club members

Notable former players

  Nikola Mitrevski
  Dejan Pecakovski
  Stefan Drogrishki
  Filip Kuzmanovski
  Goran Krstevski
  Tomislav Jagurinovski
  Lazo Majnov
  Zlatko Mojsoski
  Mihail Petrovski
  Goran Kuzmanoski
  Filip Čurlevski
  Gradimir Čanevski
  Blagojče Trajkovski
  Nikola Markoski
  Igor Arsić
  Davor Čutura
  Miloje Dolić
  Milan Filić
  Nikola Ivanović
  Milan Đukić
  Nemanja Obradović
  Marin Vegar
  Neven Stjepanović
  Josip Perić
  Elmir Građan
  Lovro Jotić
  Tomislav Kušan
  Mateo Maraš
  Josip Božić Pavletić
  Stipe Mandalinić
  Anže Ratajec
  Yevgen Umovist 
  Vladyslav Ostroushko 
  Olexandr Shevelev
  Andrey Khapal
  Rati Mskhvildze
  Márton Székely
  Sérgio Barros
  Santiago Mosquera
  Reinier Taboada
  Karim Handawy
  Achraf Adli

Notable former coaches
  Ivan Markovski
  Aleksandar Zarkov
  Andon Boshkovski
  Ilija Temelkovski
  Stevče Aluševski
  Đorđe Čirković
  Željko Babić
  Lars Walther

Supporters 

Čkembari are an Ultras group, established in 1985, who support the Macedonian sports clubs from Bitola that compete under the Pelister banner, mainly FK Pelister in football and RK Pelister in handball. The group was founded in 1985 when a caravan of 15 buses traveled to support RK Pelister who was playing against Partizan Bjelovar in a handball relegation play-off match. At that time they used the name BMČM - Bitolčani, Motorcyclists, Čkembari, Macedonians (македонски: БМЧМ - Битолчани, Мотокари, Чкембари, Македонци) later shortened to just Čkembari. Soon after, the first green and white banners were created that read: "Hell Boys" (македонски: Пеколни момци) and "Green Conquerors" (македонски: Зелени освојувачи) which started organized support for Pelister at every match. After Eurofarm Rabotnik and Pelister got mutual ownership, Čkembari became their supporters.

References

External links
Official Website 

Eurofarm Rabotnik
H